The men's individual Nordic combined competition for the 2002 Winter Olympics in Salt Lake City at Utah Olympic Park and Soldier Hollow on 9 and 10 February.

Results

Ski Jumping

Athletes did two normal hill ski jumps. The combined points earned on the jumps determined the starting order and times for the cross-country race; each point was equal to a 4 second deficit.

Cross-Country

The cross-country race was over a distance of 15 kilometres.

References

Nordic combined at the 2002 Winter Olympics